
Lawrawani (Aymara lawrawa feather of the qaqi, a species of bird, -ni Aymara suffix to indicate ownership, "the one that has got plumage of the qaqi" or "the one with plumage of the qaqi", hispanicized spelling Labrahuani) is a lake west of the Cordillera Real of Bolivia located in the La Paz Department, Los Andes Province, Batallas Municipality, Kirani Canton. It is situated at a height of about 4,475 metres (14,682 ft), south-west and west of two slightly larger lakes, Khotia Quta and Q'ara Quta, and south-west of the mountains Warawarani and Phaq'u Kiwuta.

See also 
 Ch'iyar Quta
 Juri Quta
 Taypi Chaka Quta
 Kunturiri
 Sura Quta

External links 
 Batallas Municipality population data and map showing Lake Lawrawani ("Laguna Labrahuani") situated south west of Sura Quta ("Sora Kota")

References 

Lakes of La Paz Department (Bolivia)